In J. K. Rowling's Harry Potter series, magic is depicted as a supernatural force that can be used to override the usual laws of nature. Many fictional magical creatures exist in the series, while ordinary creatures also sometimes exhibit magical properties. Magical objects are also described.  Witches and wizards refer to the rest of the population, who are generally unaware of magic, as "Muggles" in the United Kingdom and "No-Maj" in the United States.

In humans, magic or the lack thereof is an inborn attribute. It is usually inherited, carried on "dominant resilient genes". Magic is the norm for the children of magical couples and less common in those of Muggles. Exceptions exist: those unable to do magic who are born to magical parents are known as Squibs, whereas a witch or wizard born to Muggle parents is known as a Muggle-born, or by the derogatory term "Mudblood". While Muggle-borns are quite common, Squibs are extremely rare.

Rowling based many magical elements of the Harry Potter universe on real-world mythology and magic. She has described this as "a way of giving texture to the world". The books present the idea that the Muggle interpretation of these stories is a distorted version of what goes on in the wizarding world. 

The magic of Harry Potter became the subject of a 2017 British Library exhibition and accompanying documentary. The exhibition, entitled Harry Potter: A History of Magic, is the first at the British Library to be inspired by a single series by a living author.

Using magic
Witches and wizards train to learn how to control their magic. With young and untrained children, magic will manifest itself subconsciously in moments of strong apprehension, fear, anger and sadness. For example, Harry Potter once made his hair grow back after a bad haircut, set a boa constrictor on his cousin Dudley at the London Zoo, and made Aunt Marge inflate to an enormous size. While this reaction is usually uncontrollable, as an untrained child, Tom Marvolo Riddle was able to make things move without touching them, make animals do what he wanted without training them, make "bad things happen" to people who annoyed him, or make them hurt if he wanted to. In addition, Lily Evans was able to guide and control the blooming of a flower simply by wanting it to happen.

Almost all magic is done with the use of a wand. On the subject of wandless magic, Rowling says:
 
A wizard or witch is only at their best when using their own wand. When using another's wand, one's spells are not as strong as they normally would be.

Within the books, technical details of magic are obscure. Of Harry's lessons, only those involving magical beasts, magical creatures, potions or divination are given in any detail.

Severus Snape once told Harry Potter that "Time and space matter in magic" during Harry's first Occlumency lesson in Harry Potter and the Order of the Phoenix, and Albus Dumbledore told Harry after finding the magically concealed boat to reach the locket Horcrux that "Magic always leaves traces, sometimes very distinctive traces."

Spellcasting 
Spells are the every-purpose tools of a wizard or witch; short bursts of magic used to accomplish single specialised tasks such as opening locks or creating fire. Typically casting requires an incantation, most often in a modified form of Latin (see Dog Latin), and gesturing with a wand. However, Rowling has revealed that particularly talented wizards can cast spells without the aid of wand, although magic produced with one is generally more precise and powerful. Spells can also be cast non-verbally, but with a magical wand. This special technique is taught in the sixth year of study at Hogwarts and requires the caster to concentrate on the incantation. Some spells (e.g., Levicorpus) are apparently designed to be used non-verbally. While most magic shown in the books requires the caster to use their voice, some do not (and this may depend on the witch or wizard). Dumbledore has been known to do impressive feats of magic without speaking, such as conjuring enough squashy purple sleeping bags to accommodate the entire student population or during his duel with Voldemort towards the end of Order of the Phoenix.

It is possible to use a wand without holding it. In Order of the Phoenix, Harry himself performs Lumos to light his wand when it is lying on the ground somewhere near him. Additionally, Animagi and Metamorphmagi do not need wands to undergo their transformations.

Spells are divided into rough categories, such as "charms", "curses", "hexes", or "jinxes". Although offensive and potentially dangerous curses exist in number, three are considered usable only for great evil, which earns them the special classification of "Unforgivable Curses".

The limits of magic 
Before publishing the first Harry Potter novel, Rowling spent five years establishing the limitations of magic—determining what it could and could not do. "The most important thing to decide when you're creating a fantasy world," she said in 2000, "is what the characters can't do." For instance, while it is possible to conjure things out of thin air, it is far more tricky to create something that fits an exact specification rather than a general one; moreover, any objects so conjured tend not to last.

Death
Rowling has described death as the most important theme in the books. Consequently, as Dumbledore states in Harry Potter and the Goblet of Fire, there is no spell that can truly bring the dead back to life. While corpses can be transformed into obedient Inferi on a living wizard's command, they are little more than zombies with no soul or will of their own. However, there are some methods of communicating with the dead, though with limited results. For example, all Hogwarts headmasters appear in a portrait when they die, allowing consultation by future generations. It is also possible through the rare Priori Incantatem effect to converse with ghost-like "shadows" of magically murdered people. The Resurrection Stone also allows one to talk to the dead, but those brought back by the Stone are not corporeal, nor do they wish to be disturbed from their peaceful rest. Throughout the series, this limit is continually mentioned, and wizards try to transcend it at their own peril.

Likewise, it is not possible to make oneself immortal unless one makes use of an object of great power to sustain life, such as the Philosopher's Stone or Horcruxes. If one were to possess the three Deathly Hallows, it is fabled that they would possess the tools to become the "master of death". However, it is hinted that to be a true "master of death" is to be willing to accept that death is inevitable. Other methods of extending life include drinking unicorn blood, which will keep a person alive even if death is imminent, but at the terrible price of being cursed forever. Being magical can contribute to one's longevity, as there are several characters in the series who are unusually long-lived (such as Griselda Marchbanks, who was an invigilator during Albus Dumbledore's O.W.L examinations). It is revealed by Nearly Headless Nick in the fifth book that all witches and wizards have the choice of becoming ghosts upon dying; however, it is described as "a pale imitation of life". Snape states that a ghost is merely "the imprint of a departed soul left upon the earth".

Death is studied at the Department of Mysteries in a chamber containing an enigmatic veil, which Rowling has described as "the divide between life and death". With regard to what is on the other side, she elaborated: "Do I believe you go on? Yes, I do believe you go on. I do believe in an afterlife, although I'm absolutely doubt-ridden and always have been but there you are." Sirius falls through this veil in Order of the Phoenix after he is hit with a curse from Bellatrix.

Principal exceptions to Gamp's Law of Elemental Transfiguration
The principal exceptions to Gamp's Law of Elemental Transfiguration is a magical theory mentioned by Hermione and later repeated by Ron in the final book. She explains that food is one of these: Witches or wizards can cook and prepare food using magic, and even multiply it, but not create it out of nothing.

There are numerous examples in the series of food seeming to have been conjured from nothing, such as the sudden materialization of ingredients in the pots of Molly Weasley's kitchen, and when Professor McGonagall creates a self-refilling plate of sandwiches for Harry and Ron in Chamber of Secrets. In all cases, these events can be reasonably explained as food either being multiplied, or transported from elsewhere. One example of the latter is banqueting at Hogwarts – the food is prepared by elves in the kitchens and laid onto four replica tables, directly below the actual house tables in the Great Hall. The elves then magically transport the food from the replica tables up to the house tables.

This is the only exception mentioned explicitly in the series. However, Rowling herself has stated once in an interview that money is something wizards cannot simply materialize out of thin air, or the economic system of the wizarding world would then be gravely flawed and disrupted. While the Philosopher's Stone does permit alchemy, this is portrayed as an extremely rare, even unique object, whose owner does not exploit all its powers.

Emotion
As explained earlier, young untrained wizards can trigger uncontrolled magic when they are in the state of intense emotion. But emotions also affect trained witches and wizards and their magical abilities. For instance, in Half-Blood Prince, a heartbroken Nymphadora Tonks temporarily loses her power as a Metamorphmagus when Remus Lupin starts distancing himself from her; the form of her Patronus changes to reflect her depression. Another example is Merope Gaunt, who only demonstrated any magical ability when removed from her father's oppression, but then lost it again when her husband abandoned her.

Several magical spells require the use of certain emotions when casting them. The Patronus charm, for example, requires the caster to concentrate on a happy memory.
Another example is the Cruciatus Curse, which causes immense pain; as Harry discovers during a duel with Bellatrix Lestrange, effective use of this forbidden dark magic requires sadistic desires.

Love (in its broadest meaning) is depicted as a particularly powerful form of magic. According to Dumbledore, love is a "force that is at once more wonderful and more terrible than death, than human intelligence, than forces of nature". Lily's voluntary sacrifice on Harry's behalf saves him from Voldemort as a baby, and Harry makes a similar sacrifice to save his friends at the end of Deathly Hallows. A certain key prophecy in the series describes Harry as having "power the Dark Lord knows not", referencing his capacity for love.

True love is impossible to create magically; Amortentia, a love potion, can only create a powerful sense of infatuation and obsession.

Magical abilities
The following is a list of special abilities that a wizard or witch in the Harry Potter universe may have.

Animagi 
An Animagus (portmanteau of animal and magus) is a witch or wizard who can turn into a particular animal or magical creature at will. This ability is not innate: it must be acquired by magical means. All Animagi must register at a central authority by law, though a number of characters are revealed over the course of the series to have remained unregistered illegally: James Potter, Sirius Black, Peter Pettigrew and Rita Skeeter. Minerva McGonagall was a Ministry-registered Animagus taking the form of a tabby cat.
 
Animagi transformation can be performed wandlessly. Sirius and Peter are left wandless for over 10 years, but both retain the ability with no apparent ill effects. When Animagi transform they take on the appearance, not necessarily all traits, of a normal animal. In Harry Potter and the Prisoner of Azkaban, it is noted that Ron's pet rat Scabbers (later revealed as Peter Pettigrew's Animagus form) has lived over twelve years when only expected to live three. Also, an Animagus in animal form retains the ability to think like a human, which is the principal difference between being an Animagus and being transfigured into an animal. Otherwise, they would forget that they were a wizard and be trapped, unknowingly, in this form unless transformed back by another wizard. Characteristics of an Animagus' human form can manifest themselves in the animal transformation; McGonagall and Rita Skeeter have markings around their eyes that resemble their glasses, while Pettigrew has a missing toe on one of his front paws representing his missing finger. When an Animagus registers, they must record all the defining physical traits of their animal form so that the Ministry can identify them.

Each Animagus has a specific animal form, and cannot transform into any other animal. The animal cannot be chosen: it is uniquely suited to that individual's personality, and in most cases the Animagus will change into the same animal used in the person's Patronus Charm.  

Explicit emphasis is placed in the books on the differences between Animagi and werewolves. Animagi have full control over their transformations and retain their minds, whereas werewolves' transformations are involuntary and include severe changes in personality. After the person has transformed into a werewolf "...he no longer remembers who he is.  He'd kill his best friend. The werewolf only responds to the call of his own kind." The only way that a werewolf can retain his sanity, intelligence and memory while transformed is using the Wolfsbane Potion.

Metamorphmagi
A Metamorphmagus (a portmanteau of metamorph and magus) is a witch or wizard born with the innate ability to change some or all of their appearance at will. The talent cannot be learnt; a witch or wizard must be born with it.

Nymphadora Tonks and her son, Teddy Lupin are currently the only known Metamorphmagi in the series; it is a very rare ability, possibly hereditary. Tonks is known to change her hair colour and style according to her mood. She even appears as an old woman on occasion. She can also change her nose appearance, as she does when eating with the Weasley family to entertain Ginny and Hermione. Her son, Teddy Lupin, also inherited this trait, as his hair is mentioned to be repeatedly changing colour.

The extent of these appearance-altering abilities and the limits thereof are not entirely clear. According to Rowling, a Metamorphmagus can alter his or her appearance completely, for instance, from black to white, young to old, handsome to plain and so on. In one example, Tonks changes her facial appearance by reshaping her nose into "a beaklike protuberance like Snape's", to "something resembling a button mushroom", and "one like a pig snout" which reminded Harry of his cousin Dudley. The emotional state of a Metamorphmagus can affect their abilities.

Parseltongue
Parseltongue is the language of snakes. It is often associated with Dark Magic, although Dumbledore stated that it is not necessarily an evil quality. Those possessing the ability to speak it (Parselmouths) occur very rarely. People apparently acquire the skill through learning or via a method of xenoglossia, such as through genetic inheritance or by use of Dark or dangerous magic. Harry was a Parselmouth until the age of 17. Harry Potter and the Chamber of Secrets explains this was because of Voldemort's passing on some of his abilities to Harry the night he tried to kill him. Deathly Hallows reveals that a part of Voldemort's soul within Harry grants him this ability, which is later destroyed leaving Harry stripped of the ability.

Harry temporarily regains the ability in The Cursed Child, along with a pain in the scar.

Other known Parselmouths include Salazar Slytherin and his descendants, including the Gaunts and Voldemort. Dumbledore could also understand Parseltongue; he learned it and did not naturally possess the ability. In Half-Blood Prince, he repeats Morfin Gaunt's words "the big house over the way", which were spoken in Parseltongue.

Ron uses Parseltongue in the final book to reopen the Chamber of Secrets, but he is only imitating the sound of a phrase Harry used in the book Chamber of Secrets.

Rowling borrowed the term from "an old word for someone who has a problem with the mouth, like a hare lip".

Seers
A Seer is a witch or wizard with the clairvoyant ability to predict future events. The predictions given through this ability can sometimes be self-fulfilling prophecies, and Dumbledore states in Order of the Phoenix that not all of them come true, depending on the choices made by those mentioned. This would seem to indicate that a Seer predicts possible or likely events, at least in some cases. 

In the Hall of Prophecy at the Department of Mysteries, thousands upon thousands of glass spheres are imbued with records of prophecies made by Seers. Only a person mentioned in a prophecy can safely retrieve it; anyone else who tries to do so will be driven insane.

According to McGonagall, true Seers are extremely rare. Sybill Trelawney is the only Seer portrayed in the books, and is considered an "old fraud" by her students -- although it is mentioned that Sybill's great-great-grandmother, Cassandra Trelawney, was a renowned Seer in her day. Trelawney is ultimately sacked by Dolores Umbridge in the fifth book for her lack of ability.  She has twice made true prophecies -- both of significance to Harry Potter -- but had no recollection of either prediction afterward.

Legilimency and Occlumency
Legilimency is the magical skill of extracting feelings and memories from another person's mind—a form of magical "telepathy" (although Snape, an able practitioner of the art, dismisses the colloquial term "mind-reading", as a drastic oversimplification). It also allows one to convey visions or memories to another person, whether real or imaginary. A witch or wizard possessing this skill is called a Legilimens, and can, for example, detect lies and deceit in another person, witness memories in another person's past, or "plant" false visions in another's mind.

The counter-skill to Legilimency is Occlumency (and its user, known as an Occlumens), by which one can compartmentalize one's emotions, or prevent a Legilimens from discovering thoughts or memories which contradict one's spoken words or actions. An advanced form of Occlumency is planting false temporary memories inside an Occlumens' own head while blocking all other true memories, so if a Legilimens, even a highly skilled one, were to attempt to read the mind, he or she would find false memories only and believe everything was right.

The skills are first mentioned in Order of the Phoenix. Legilimency and Occlumency are not part of the normal curriculum at Hogwarts, and most students would graduate without learning them. 

Voldemort, Snape, and Dumbledore are all skilled in Legilimency and Occlumency, albeit with the use of their wands. Voldemort is said to be the master of Legilimency by Snape, as he, in almost all cases, immediately knows if someone lied to him. In addition, in Deathly Hallows, Voldemort repeatedly uses Legilimency to interrogate his victims. Voldemort practices Occlumency throughout the period of Half-Blood Prince to deny Harry access to his thoughts and emotions. However, in Deathly Hallows, Voldemort repeatedly loses grip, resulting in occasional but very powerful burst of thoughts, visions and emotions to be sent to Harry.

Throughout the books, Snape is repeatedly said to be highly skilled in Occlumency, explaining how he was able to deceive Voldemort for years. Even before Order of the Phoenix, Harry has the impression that Snape can read minds.

During the Order of the Phoenix Snape is instructed by Dumbledore to give Harry lessons in Occlumency. Due to the antagonism between the two, and Harry's secret desire to know Voldemort's thoughts, he makes poor progress, and only once manages to overcome Snape and enter his mind.  In Deathly Hallows, Harry finally masters Occlumency—shutting his mind to Voldemort—when Dobby dies. He realises that his grief—or as Dumbledore calls it, love—is what can block out the Dark Lord.

Queenie Goldstein, in Fantastic Beasts and Where to Find Them, is revealed to be a proficient Legilimens, born with the ability, as she is able to read the minds of Jacob Kowalski and others in the film, as well as sense and hear them from afar through their thoughts and emotions. Unlike Snape, Voldemort and Dumbledore she does not require a wand to cast the spells of Legilimency as the ability to read minds comes naturally to her.

Apparition and Disapparition

Apparition is a magical form of teleportation, through which a witch or wizard can disappear ("Disapparate") from one location and reappear ("Apparate") in another. It is usually accompanied by a loud cracking or popping sound, though the more skilled wizards such as Dumbledore can Apparate "so suddenly and silently" that they seem to have "popped out of the ground". According to Harry, apparition is also accompanied by a very unpleasant squeezing sensation, as though being sent through a tight rubber tube.

The Ministry of Magic licenses Apparition. A witch or wizard must be 17 years old or older and have a licence to Apparate as a means of transportation in much the same way real-world governments require individuals to have a licence to drive a motor vehicle. Students at Hogwarts may attend Ministry-administered Apparition lessons during their sixth year, and take their examination once they turn seventeen. It is shown that although it is possible to Apparate without a licence, it is not usually done (unless in lessons) and is illegal. In Deathly Hallows, Harry does not possess a licence, but since his Trace has been lifted, the Ministry is likely unaware that he does it.

Learning to Apparate is difficult, and students run the risk of splinching—being physically split between the origin and destination—which requires the assistance of the Ministry's Accidental Magic Reversal Squad to undo properly, although essence of dittany can also mend certain wounds. Splinching is quite common during lessons, and can be uncomfortable (and at times rather gruesome) depending on the body parts splinched, but is ultimately harmless if properly reversed. Although Ron can Apparate, he isn't terribly skilled at it, and splinches himself at least three times (once losing half an eyebrow, two fingernails and part of his arm). Harry and Hermione both pick up the skill quickly in comparison. As explained in the Half-Blood Prince, there is no word spell to Apparate or Disapparate, but the caster has to concentrate on the location on which he has to apparate, needs to be fully focused on the spell, and also has to "feel" it through the whole body.

It has been indicated that it is considered rude to Apparate directly into a private area, such as a home. Dumbledore states in Half-Blood Prince that it would be "quite as rude as kicking down the front door". For this reason, and for reasons of security, many homes have Anti-Apparition spells protecting them from uninvited intrusions. The accepted way to travel to a home is to Apparate to a nearby location and continue to the final destination on foot. Apparition is considered unreliable over long distances, and even experienced users of the technique sometimes prefer other means of transport, such as broomsticks. Rowling has stated that Apparating over long distances depends on the skill of the wizard, and "Cross-continental Apparition would almost certainly result in severe injury or death." Indeed, even the prodigiously skilled Lord Voldemort elects to fly back to England after visiting the far-flung Nurmengard.

For reasons of security, the grounds and buildings of Hogwarts are protected by ancient Anti-Apparition and Anti-Disapparition spells, which prevent humans from Apparating on the school grounds. There is also a spell that prevents individuals from Disapparating, which Dumbledore places on the Death Eaters captured at the Ministry in Order of the Phoenix; a sister spell, which allows one to Apparate into a location but prevents them from Disapparating out of it, is cast by the Death Eaters in Hogsmeade in concordance with the Caterwauling Charm. Dumbledore is the only person who can both Apparate and Disapparate from the school grounds, since he is the headmaster.

A witch or wizard can use Side-Along Apparition to take others with them during Apparition. Dumbledore successfully transports Harry this way several times in Half-Blood Prince, and Harry's first non-lesson attempt at the skill is the Side-Along Apparition with the weakened Dumbledore when they return from the seaside cave. 

In the Order of the Phoenix film, Death Eaters and Order members Apparate and Disapparate in clouds of black and white smoke respectively. In the film, both sides also appear to be able to "half-apparate" in which their bodies were made out of smoke, giving them the ability to fly. Both times Fred and George apparated and disapparated, they did it with a pop as in the books.

In the books, the words "Apparate" and "Disapparate", like many other neologisms used by Rowling, are capitalised, whereas established English words such as "jinx" and "hex" are not. The words themselves are most likely derived from the French apparaître and disparaître, meaning 'to appear' and 'to disappear'. Another possible derivation is from the English word "apparition", meaning "a supernatural appearance of a person or thing; anything that appears, especially something remarkable or startling; an act of appearing", which comes from the Latin "apparitio", meaning attendance. "Disapparate" probably comes from the same word but with the prefix "dis-" expressing negation or reversal.

Other teleportation
Some magical creatures have their own forms of instantaneous travel, such as a house elf's ability to teleport or a phoenix's ability to appear and disappear in a burst of flame. Unlike wizards, these creatures are not restricted by anti-Apparition magic. Dobby, Kreacher, and the rest of the house-elf population can Apparate within the Hogwarts grounds, as they demonstrate on multiple occasions, most notably when Dobby visits Harry in the hospital wing, and when Harry summons Dobby and Kreacher and assigns them to tail Draco Malfoy. Fawkes Disapparates from the headmaster's office at Hogwarts along with Dumbledore when the latter evades arrest at the hands of Ministry officials in Order of the Phoenix. 

Some magical devices like the Floo Network, Portkeys and Vanishing Cabinets also provide forms of magical teleportation.

Veela charm
An ability attributed to  Veela and those of Veela heritage, such as Fleur Delacour, Veela charm is used to charm males, much as the Sirens do in The Odyssey. Men who are exposed to it over time become more resistant to it, although the Veela charm takes full effect if the Veela surprises the man, as noted by Ron in Half-Blood Prince.

As shown in Goblet of Fire, one can use Veela hair as cores in magical wands. According to famed wandmaker Mr. Ollivander, these wands are a little "temperamental".

Magical resistance
Powerful creatures such as trolls, dragons, and giants may exhibit magical resistance—a certain degree of immunity against hexes and spells. Hagrid is resistant to certain spells (like the Stunning Spell) due to his giant blood. This type of resistance is not insurmountable; if enough Stunning Spells, for example, are fired simultaneously at a creature with magical resistance, the creature may still be rendered unconscious. Also, wizards and witches can resist certain spells with the power of their own sheer will, as Harry does in Goblet of Fire, when Barty Crouch Jr. (disguised as Alastor Moody) tries to control Harry with the Imperius curse and Harry resists. The same book shows Barty Crouch Sr. throwing off the Imperius Curse after spending several months under it.

Subjects at Hogwarts
At Hogwarts, students must study a core group of subjects for the first two years, after which they must choose between several electives. During their final two years, students are permitted to take more specialized subjects such as Alchemy.

Transfiguration, Defence Against the Dark Arts, Charms, Potions, Astronomy, History of Magic, and Herbology are compulsory subjects for the first five years, as well as flying lessons for the first year, which becomes optional for the remaining six years. At the end of their second year, students are required to add at least two optional subjects to their syllabus for the start of the third year. The five choices are Arithmancy, Muggle Studies, Divination, Study of Ancient Runes and Care of Magical Creatures. Very specialised subjects such as Alchemy are sometimes offered in the final two years, if there is sufficient demand. There is a total of twelve named Professors at Hogwarts, each specializing in one of these subjects.

Transfiguration
Transfiguration is essentially the art of changing the properties of an object. Transfiguration is a theory-based subject, including topics such as "Switching Spells" (altering only a part of some object, such as when Hagrid gave Dudley a pig tail); Vanishing Spells (causing an object to completely disappear); and Conjuring Spells (creating objects out of thin air). It is possible to change inanimate objects into animate ones and vice versa – Minerva McGonagall, the class's teacher, transfigures her desk into a pig and back in Philosopher's Stone.

Defence Against the Dark Arts

Defence Against the Dark Arts, commonly shortened to D.A.D.A., is the class that teaches students defensive techniques to defend against the Dark Arts, and to be protected from Dark creatures. In Harry Potter and the Deathly Hallows, with Death Eaters in charge of the school, the subject is renamed the Dark Arts, and involves pupils practicing the Cruciatus Curse on those who have earned detentions. The subject has an extraordinarily high turnover of staff members—throughout the series no Defence Against the Dark Arts teacher has retained the post for more than one school year. Dumbledore also once stated that this post is cursed. Harry is exceptionally skilled in this subject.  During the period the story takes place, the class is taught by Quirinus Quirrell (book one), Gilderoy Lockhart (book two), Remus Lupin (book three), Bartemius Crouch Jr impersonating Alastor "Mad-eye" Moody (book four), Dolores Umbridge (book five), Severus Snape (book six), and Amycus Carrow (book seven). Hagrid suggests in Harry Potter and the Chamber of Secrets that "They're startin' ter think the job's jinxed. No one's lasted long for a while now." as each D.A.D.A. teacher has only taught for one year. In Half-Blood Prince, Dumbledore suggests that Voldemort cursed the position because his application for it was rejected. The existence of the jinx was eventually confirmed by Rowling. The position had also been coveted by Snape, but he was denied the position as well. Snape was finally appointed D.A.D.A. professor in Half-Blood Prince. Rowling announced in an interview that once Voldemort had died, the jinx he placed on the office was lifted and a permanent professor had been teaching the subject between the end of Deathly Hallows and the epilogue, set nineteen years afterwards. Furthermore, she imagines that Harry Potter occasionally comes to the class to give lectures on the subject.

Charms
Charms is the class that teaches how to develop incantations for the uses of bewitchment. Rowling has described Charms as a type of magic spell concerned with giving an object new and unexpected properties. Charms classes are described as notoriously noisy and chaotic, as the lessons are largely practical. Many of the exposition sequences in the books are set in Charms classes, which are on the second floor of Hogwarts. The class is taught by Filius Flitwick.

Potions

Potions is described as the art of creating mixtures with magical effects. It requires the correct mixing and stirring of ingredients at the right times and temperatures. As to the question of whether a Muggle could brew a potion, given the correct magical ingredients, Rowling said on Pottermore that "There is always some element of wandwork necessary to make a potion." Severus Snape's lessons are depicted as unhappy, oppressing times set in a gloomy dungeon in the basement of the castle, whilst Horace Slughorn's, who replaces Snape as Potions Master, are shown as more cheerful and even fun at times. J.K. Rowling explains that she wrote Snape, Harry's arch enemy on Hogwarts faculty, because she herself hated chemistry class, and this was the Hogwarts equivalent.

Notable potions featured in the series include the love potion Amortentia, Confusing Concoction, Draught of Living Death, Draught of Peace, the luck potion Felix Felicis, Pepperup Potion, Polyjuice Potion, Skele-Gro Sleekeazy's Hair Potion, and the truth serum Veritaserum.

Astronomy
Astronomy classes take place in the Astronomy Tower, the tallest tower in Hogwarts, and are taught by Professor Aurora Sinistra. Lessons involve observations of the night skies with telescopes. No astronomy lessons are shown in the books, but they are frequently referenced. Rowling describes one of Harry's Astronomy exams in Harry Potter and the Order of the Phoenix. Also, bits of the Astronomy Tower are seen throughout the film series, such as Chamber of Secrets and Prisoner of Azkaban, featured in Half-Blood Prince, as the place where Dumbledore died, and seen in Deathly Hallows. Known student homework activities include learning the names of stars, constellations and planets, and their location, movements, and environments. The Astronomy Tower is also one of the three tallest towers in the Hogwarts grounds, as mentioned in The Deathly Hallows.

History of Magic
History of Magic is the study of magical history. Cuthbert Binns' lessons are depicted as some of the most boring at Hogwarts. They are only lectures, given without pause, about significant events in wizarding history. Topics have included goblin rebellions, giant wars, and the origins of wizarding secrecy. This is the only class at Hogwarts that is taught by a ghost, as the professor never noticed he had died and simply continued teaching as if nothing had changed.

Herbology
Herbology is the study of magical plants and how to take care of, utilise and combat them. There are at least three greenhouses described in the books, holding a variety of magical plants. Herbology is also the only subject Neville Longbottom excels in and later on also becomes a professor in the same subject. The epilogue to Deathly Hallows explains that he later replaces Professor Pomona Sprout as the Herbology teacher.

Arithmancy

Arithmancy is a branch of magic concerned with the magical properties of numbers. As Harry Potter does not take this subject, the class is never described in the books. It is, however, a favourite subject of Hermione. Arithmancy is reportedly difficult, as it requires memorising or working with many charts. In Order of the Phoenix, it is mentioned that the study of Arithmancy is required to become a Curse-Breaker for Gringotts. The subject is taught by Professor Septima Vector.

Study of Ancient Runes
Study of Ancient Runes, more commonly known as Ancient Runes, is a generally theoretical subject that studies the ancient runic scripts. Because Hermione is the only known student of the class in the books, little else is known about this subject, taught by Professor Bathsheda Babbling. In Deathly Hallows Dumbledore bequeaths his copy of The Tales of Beedle the Bard, which is written in ancient runes, to Hermione.

Divination
Divination is the art of predicting the future. Various methods are described, including tea leaves, fire omens, crystal balls, palmistry, cartomancy (including the reading of conventional playing cards and the tarot), astrology, and dream interpretations. Divination is described by Professor McGonagall as "one of the most imprecise branches of magic". Supporters of the subject claim that it is an inexact science that requires innate gifts such as the "Inner Eye". Those opposed claim that the subject is irrelevant and fraudulent. Harry is first taught Divination by Professor Trelawney, and then later by Firenze after Trelawney is sacked by Dolores Umbridge in Harry's fifth year. In the sixth (and presumably seventh) year, Firenze and Professor Trelawney share Divination classes, divided by year.

Care of Magical Creatures

Care of Magical Creatures is the class which instructs students on how to care for magical beasts. Classes are held outside the castle. In Harry's first two years, the class is taken by Professor Silvanus Kettleburn who then retires "in order to enjoy more time with his remaining limbs". Dumbledore then recruits the gamekeeper Rubeus Hagrid to accept a teaching position along with his gamekeeping duties. Although Hagrid is obviously very experienced and knowledgeable, he doesn't "have a normal person's view of what's dangerous", an example being that the Care of Magical Creatures students were required to get a literally ferocious textbook called the "Monster Book of Monsters", and so consistently misjudges the risk that the animals he uses in his lessons pose to his students, which sometimes results in chaos. When Hagrid is absent, his lessons are taken over by Wilhelmina Grubbly-Plank, a witch and an acquaintance of Dumbledore's.

Muggle Studies
Muggle Studies is a class that involves the study of the Muggle (non-magical) culture "from a wizarding point of view." The only need for witches and wizards to learn about Muggle ways and means is to ensure they can blend in with Muggles while needing to do so (for example, at the 1994 Quidditch World Cup). As the class is only mentioned as being taken by Hermione, and for just one year, little is known about its curriculum.
In the opening chapter of the final book, Voldemort murders Professor Charity Burbage because she portrays Muggles in a positive light and is opposed to limiting wizardry to only people of pure-blood origins. For the rest of the academic year covered by Deathly Hallows, the Death Eater Alecto Carrow teaches Muggle Studies. However, her lessons (which are made compulsory) mainly describe Muggles and Muggle-borns as subhuman and worthy of persecution.

Alchemy
Alchemy classes are not mentioned in the Harry Potter series; however, Rowling has used Alchemy as an example of a 'specialized' subject offered when there is sufficient demand. Alchemy is a philosophical tradition searching for the philosopher's stone, which is said to have the power to turn base metals into gold and to contain the elixir of life, which makes or keeps the drinker young and immortal. As mentioned in Harry Potter and the Philosopher's Stone, Nicholas Flamel created a Philosopher's Stone, but it was destroyed at the end of Harry's first year.

Flying
Flying is the class that teaches the use of broomsticks made for the use of flying and is taught only to Hogwarts first years by Rolanda Hooch. The subject is the only one that requires physicality. The only flying lesson depicted in the Harry Potter series is in Harry Potter and the Philosopher's Stone; the class is never mentioned in following installments; and is not a part of the O.W.L. exams during Harry's fifth year.

Apparition
Apparition is an optional class for those in the sixth and seventh years at Hogwarts in preparation for obtaining their license to apparate, or disappear and reappear instantly in another location. In Harry's sixth year, Wilkie Twycross, a Ministry of Magic Apparition instructor, teaches the lessons. Magical enchantments on Hogwarts castle and grounds prevent Apparition and Disapparition inside the castle; however Half-Blood Prince explains that these protections are temporarily relaxed within the Great Hall for short periods to permit students to practice. Students are warned, though, that they will not be able to Apparate outside of the Great Hall and that it would be unwise to try. Splinching is a common mistake in apparition which causes body parts to split. It is impossible to track anyone by apparition unless the person grabs the apparator’s clothing or body.

Spell-like effects

Unbreakable Vow
The Unbreakable Vow is a voluntary agreement made between two witches or wizards. It must be performed with a witness ("Bonder") on hand, holding their wand on the agreeing persons' linked hands to bind them with magic as a tongue of flame. The Vow is not literally "unbreakable" as the person taking it is still able to go back on his or her word, but doing so will cause instant death. The Unbreakable Vow was first introduced in Half-Blood Prince, in which Snape made a promise to Narcissa Malfoy to protect Draco, with Bellatrix as the "Bonder", as her son attempted to fulfil the Dark Lord's task, and for Snape to fulfil the task if Draco fails. Another example in Half-Blood Prince occurs when Ron tells Harry how Fred and George tried to make him undertake an Unbreakable Vow, but because of their father's intervention, they did not succeed.

Priori Incantatem
Priori Incantatem (from Latin: priorem incantatum – a previous spell), or the Reverse Spell Effect, is used to detect the spells cast by a wand. The spells cast by the wand will emerge in smoky or ghost-like replicas in reverse order, with the latest spell emerging first. It is first encountered in Goblet of Fire when Barty Crouch Sr.'s house elf Winky is caught holding Harry's wand. This spell is used to reveal that it was indeed Harry's wand that was used by Crouch's son to cast the Dark Mark. In Harry Potter and the Half-Blood Prince, it is revealed that the teenage Voldemort murdered his father and grandparents using his uncle Morfin's wand, knowing that, when examined, the wand would incriminate Morfin as the murderer. In Deathly Hallows, Harry fears that a Priori Incantatem spell will be used on Hermione's wand after the Death Eaters get hold of it. This would reveal that she had accidentally broken his holly-and-phoenix-feather wand when a curse misfired and they both narrowly escaped Voldemort earlier. As a result, the protection of the shared cores was lost and, worse still, this would now be made known to Voldemort. During the final duel between Harry and Voldemort, the latter mentions that he knows that the holly and phoenix wand is destroyed, implying that the Priori Incantatem has indeed been performed on Hermione's wand, as they had feared.

Forcing two wands that share the source of their cores to do battle can also cause a more potent form of Priori Incantatem. The tips of the two wands will connect, forming a thick golden "thread" of energy, and the two wands' masters fight a battle of wills. The loser's wand will regurgitate shadows of spells that it has cast in reverse order. This phenomenon occurs during the duel between Harry and Voldemort at the end of Goblet of Fire. Their simultaneous spells (Harry and Voldemort cast "Expelliarmus" and "Avada Kedavra" respectively) trigger the threads, and as Voldemort loses the battle of wills, his wand regurgitates, in reverse order, echoes of the people his wand had last murdered: Cedric Diggory; Frank Bryce; Bertha Jorkins; as well as Harry's parents.

Dark Arts
The Dark Arts are magical spells and practices that are usually used for malicious purposes. Practitioners of Dark Arts are referred to as Dark witches or wizards. The most prominent of these is Voldemort, known to them as the Dark Lord. His followers, known as Death Eaters, practice the Dark Arts while doing his bidding.

The type of spells characteristic of Dark Arts are known as curses, which usually cause harm to the target. All, to a certain degree, are in some circumstances justifiable. The motivation of the caster affects a curse's result. This is most clearly outlined for the Cruciatus curse: When cast by Harry, angered by the death of his godfather at Bellatrix's hands and desiring to punish her, it causes a short moment of pain. As Bellatrix herself comments, righteous anger does not allow the spell to work for long. When cast by figures such as Voldemort, who desire to inflict pain for its own sake, it causes intense agony that can last as long as the Dark witch or wizard persists.

Use of Dark Magic can corrupt the soul and body; Voldemort has used such magic in his quest to prolong his life and obtain great power. The Dark Arts also cause Voldemort to look deformed and inhuman, a side effect of splitting his soul into Horcruxes.

According to Snape, the Dark Arts "are many, varied, ever-changing and eternal ... unfixed, mutating, indestructible". In magical dueling, there are any number of spells that may be used to attack, immobilise, or disarm an opponent without causing pain or lasting harm; however, spells such as the Cruciatus Curse wound or seriously distress a victim in some way. Dark spells can be classified into three groups: Jinxes, hexes, and curses.

In the wizarding world, use of the Dark Arts is strongly stigmatised and extreme forms are illegal; however, these spells are prevalent enough that even before the rise of Voldemort, many schools (including Hogwarts) taught Defence Against the Dark Arts as a standard subject. Techniques include anti-curses and simple spells to disable or disarm attackers, or fight off certain creatures. Some schools, such as Durmstrang, teach Dark Magic. A Dark Arts class is also taught at Hogwarts while it is under Death Eater control.

Unforgivable Curses
The Unforgivable Curses are the most powerful known Dark Arts spells. They were first classified as unforgivable in 1717. Used by the books' villains, such as Voldemort and the Death Eaters and in some cases the Ministry of Magic, their use inspires horror and great fear amongst others. The curses are so named because their use is forbidden and unforgivable in the wizarding world and is punishable by a life sentence in Azkaban. The only exception is if a person is proven to have done them under the influence of mind control. These curses are thus very rarely used openly.

 The Killing Curse (incantation: Avada Kedavra) manifests as a jet of green light that causes immediate death. The Killing Curse has no counter-curse and cannot be blocked by most magical means, although it can be blocked by love (i.e. Lily Potter giving up her life for her son). However, the green energy bolt may be dodged, blocked by solid objects, or intercepted with a few other powerful fast spells, particularly Stunning spells.
 The Cruciatus Curse (incantation: Crucio, Latin for "I torture") causes the victim intense pain and is used for torture, but does not physically harm them. The strength of the curse is determined by the person who cast it. It was used regularly by the Death Eaters. The curse can  torture a person to the point that they are exhausted to death, or in a more sadistic case, it causes permanent amnesia and insanity. Effective casting requires the caster to have sadistic desires. It is shown as a bright-faded blue light (though it is usually invisible or even a red bolt of light in the films).
 The Imperius Curse (incantation: Imperio, dog Latin for "I command") is used for mind control or hypnosis and can force the victim to do things they would normally be unwilling or unable to. The strength and duration of the curse depends on the caster, as well as the level of resistance of the victim. The curse is shown as a bright haze (while it was either invisible or green, mist-like haze in the films). 

The use of the Unforgivable Curses was authorised against Voldemort and his followers by Bartemius Crouch Sr, during the First Wizarding War. (Shortly after his resurrection, Voldemort names two Death Eaters "killed by Aurors".) In addition, in Deathly Hallows, the Unforgivable Curses are used liberally by good characters, ranging from Professor McGonagall with the Imperius Curse, to Harry effectively using the Cruciatus Curse. He also uses the Imperius Curse on a goblin and a suspicious Death Eater during their disguised attack upon Gringotts Bank.

Dark Mark 

The Dark Mark is the symbol of Voldemort and the Death Eaters and takes the form of a skull with a snake coming out of the mouth in place of a tongue. The mark is cast into the sky by Death Eaters whenever they have murdered someone. Morsmordre is the spell to conjure the Mark. It first appears in Goblet of Fire and is described as a "colossal skull, composed of what looked like emerald stars, with a serpent protruding from its mouth like a tongue". Once in the sky it was "blazing in a haze of greenish smoke". Dark Marks are also branded on the left forearm of the closest followers of Voldemort. The mark serves as a connection between Voldemort and each who bears it; he can summon them by touching his mark, causing it and those of his followers to burn and change colour. Death Eaters can summon Voldemort in the same fashion. Following Voldemort's ultimate defeat, the Dark Marks on his Death Eaters fade into a scar "similar" to Harry's. In the books, the Dark Mark is described as green; however, in the films, it was only green at the Quidditch World Cup. In all other film appearances it has been grey.

Inferius

An inferius (plural: inferi)
is a corpse controlled through a dark wizard's spells. An inferius is not alive, but a dead body that has been bewitched into acting like a puppet for the witch or wizard; this manifests as a white mist in the controlled corpse’s eyes. They do not think for themselves: They are created to perform a specific duty assigned by the dark wizard who commands them, and as seen in the inferi guarding Voldemort's horcrux in a seaside cave, remain idle until their task can be performed. This task is then thoughtlessly carried out, whether or not it will produce any result. Inferi are difficult to harm by magic; however, they can be repelled by fire or any other forms of heat or light, as the inferi in Voldemort's cave are. When defeated, they return to their idle state.

Inferi are considered dangerous and frightening enough by the magical world that impersonating an inferius (as Mundungus Fletcher is reported to have done in Half-Blood Prince) is an offense worthy of imprisonment in Azkaban.

The Ministry of Magic fears that Voldemort is killing enough people to make an army of inferi: As they are dead, they are very difficult to stop. When Voldemort was hiding one of his Horcruxes in the past, he filled a lake in a cave with many inferi, which were to attack and drown anyone but Voldemort who came into the cavern and took the locket. When Harry and Dumbledore took the locket, the inferi attacked Harry; Dumbledore repelled them with a rope of fire. It is also revealed that the inferi almost killed Kreacher after he drank from the basin to help Voldemort hide his horcruxes, but having been ordered to return to his master after his task with Voldemort was complete, he was able to apparate out of the cave. These inferi later killed Regulus Black when he stole the horcrux and ordered Kreacher to destroy it.

Horcrux

A horcrux is an object created using dark magic to attain effective immortality. The concept is first introduced in the sixth novel, Harry Potter and the Half-Blood Prince, although horcruxes are present in earlier novels without being explained or identified as such.

To create a horcrux, a witch or wizard must first prepare the chosen object in a ritual which Rowling described only as “too horrible to go into detail about”. Following the preparation of the object, the witch or wizard must then take a life, an act which splits the soul. Following that, further dark rituals are required in order to remove the soul shard from the maker and place it into the prepared object. Once this is done, the horcrux becomes magically protected from almost all forms of destruction, requiring extremely powerful magic or especially destructive substances to do so.

Ordinarily, when one’s body is killed, the soul departs for the next world. If, however, the body of a horcrux maker is killed, that portion of his soul which was still in his body will not pass on to the next world, but will rather exist in a non-corporeal form capable of being resurrected by another wizard. If all of someone’s horcruxes are destroyed, then his soul’s only anchor in the material world would be his body, the destruction of which would then cause his final death. To destroy the horcrux, the destroyer must destroy it in such a way that it is put beyond magical repair. In the second book, Tom Riddle’s diary (later found to be a horcrux) is destroyed by Harry with a basilisk’s venomous fang. In the seventh book, Gryffindor’s sword, which is impregnated with basilisk venom, an old basilisk fang, and fiendfyre are the substances used to destroy them.

Portraits
In the Harry Potter series the subjects of magical portraits (even those of characters that are dead) can move, interact with living observers, speak and demonstrate apparent emotion and personality. Some can even move to other portraits to visit each other, or relay messages, or (if more than one painting of the subject exists) move between separate locations by way of their portraits. An example of this is Phineas Nigellus Black (Sirius Black's great-great-grandfather), who has a painting in the Headmaster's office to offer advice to the current headmaster and another one at 12 Grimmauld Place. Many such portraits are found on the walls of Hogwarts. 

Some portraits are used to conceal the entrance of a room or passageway. For example, the Fat Lady's portrait covers the entrance to the Gryffindor common room, and she can swing the portrait open when given the correct password or close to prevent entry. In Harry Potter and the Deathly Hallows, there is a portrait of Ariana Dumbledore in the Room of Requirement that conceals a secret passageway to the Hog's Head Inn. Also, a painting of a large fruit bowl disguises the entrance to the Hogwarts kitchen and house elves' quarters, which will swing open to reveal a hidden door if the pear is tickled.

Portraits are enchanted to move by the artist, but the degree to which they can interact with others depends on the power of the subject. Rowling has commented that a portrait is merely a faint imprint of the deceased subject, imitating their basic personality and thought patterns. They are therefore "not as fully realised as ghosts".  In Harry Potter and the Cursed Child the portrait of Albus Dumbledore describes himself as only "paint and memory" and Professor McGonagall (his successor as headteacher of Hogwarts) comments that, although she speaks to Dumbledore to help her in making decisions, she is careful to remember that "portraits don't represent even half of their subjects".

Portraits in the Headmaster's office
The portraits in the Headmaster's office depict all the former Heads of Hogwarts, with the exception of Dolores Umbridge. They advise the Headmaster and are "honour-bound to give service to the present headmaster" (according to Armando Dippet). Rowling has explained that portraits of past headteachers tend to be more realistic than most, as the subject in question usually imparts knowledge and teaches them how to behave before their death. The portrait of Snape was installed in the Headmaster's Office at Harry's request.

The Fat Lady
The portrait of the Fat Lady covers the door to Gryffindor Tower.
She will open it (sometimes grudgingly) when the correct password is uttered. She is often upset after being awoken, and is sometimes seen drunk with her best friend, Violet. The Fat Lady has no other known name – even the unfailingly polite Albus Dumbledore refers to her only as "the Fat Lady" – and it may be that she does not represent a real person but is instead an invention of her portrait's artist. In Philosopher's Stone, she leaves her portrait in the middle of the night, locking Harry, Ron, Hermione, and Neville out of Gryffindor Tower, forcing them to run across the school. Luckily for them, when they return, she has returned to her portrait, allowing them to escape into Gryffindor Tower.

In Prisoner of Azkaban, Sirius Black slashes the Fat Lady's portrait when she won't let him in without a password and it is some time before she dares to guard Gryffindor Tower again. After her portrait is restored, she requests protection in case someone tries to attack her portrait again. Thus, two security trolls are hired. In Half-Blood Prince, she gets so annoyed with Harry's late return that she pretends the password has changed and tries to call him back when he heads off to talk to Dumbledore. When Harry later confirms Dumbledore's death, she lets out a sob and, for the only time in the series, she opens without the password for Harry in her grief.

Photographs
Wizarding photographs of people have similar properties to magical painted portraits: the figures within move about or even sometimes leave the frame. They appear in wizard newspapers and other print media, as well as on Chocolate Frog cards. Colin Creevey mentions in Chamber of Secrets that a boy in his dormitory said that if he develops the film from his Muggle camera 'in the right potion', the pictures will move. However, unlike portraits, figures in wizarding pictures cannot speak and display little sentience. It appears that they do have some knowledge of current events, as in Order of the Phoenix, the family photograph on Arthur's desk shows everyone except Percy "who appeared to have walked out of it".

Footnotes

References

Further reading

External links

Fictional elements introduced in 1997
Fictional universe of Harry Potter
Harry Potter

fr:Univers de Harry Potter#Magie